Josu Zabala López (born 11 April 1993 in Lumbier) is a Spanish cyclist, who last rode for UCI Continental team .

References

External links

1993 births
Living people
Spanish male cyclists
Cyclists from Navarre